Karen Brooks (born April 30, 1954) is an American country music singer and songwriter who is best known for a series of singles recorded by Emmylou Harris, Rosanne Cash, Patty Loveless, Tanya Tucker, Russell Smith, David Allen Coe, Crystal Gayle and Exile. She won a Grammy for her contribution to the soundtrack for the Sesame Street movie Follow That Bird. She sang a duet with Johnny Cash, "I Will Dance With You", and  also with T. G. Sheppard, "Faking Love", which was a number one hit on the Billboard country chart in February 1983. She also had a number of top 40 songs as a recording artist on Warner Records.

Brooks was born in Dallas, Texas, United States.  She attended Justin F. Kimball High School with schoolmate Stevie Ray Vaughan (Class of '72). She was formerly married to Gary P. Nunn, with whom she had one child, a son, Lukin Tolliver Nunn. Her mother, Lynn Brooks, was a make-up artist in the motion-picture industry. During the latter half of the 1970s and the early half of the 1980s, she lent her vocals to recordings by Jerry Jeff Walker, David Allan Coe, Steven Fromholz, Gary P. Nunn, Townes Van Zandt,  Anne Murray and Emmylou Harris.

She remained a popular background singer for much of the late 1970s. She then headed to California to work alongside Rodney Crowell, where she eventually picked up a recording contract with Warner Bros. Records. Both "New Way Out" and "Faking Love" hit the Top 20 of Billboard.

Discography

Albums

Singles

References

1954 births
Living people
Bryan Adams High School alumni
American women country singers
American country singer-songwriters
People from Dallas
Musicians from Austin, Texas
Warner Records artists
Singer-songwriters from Texas
Country musicians from Texas
21st-century American women